The Cape dorid (Hypselodoris capensis) is a species of sea slug, a dorid nudibranch. It is a marine gastropod mollusc in the family Chromodorididae.

Distribution
This species can found around the South African coast from the Cape Peninsula to the Wild Coast subtidally to at least 20 m. It is probably endemic.

Description
The Cape dorid is a white-bodied dorid with a smooth skin. It has opaque white lines along the notum and irregular reddish-orange spots. It has a broken blue-purple margin. It has eight gills arranged around the anus and its rhinophores are perfoliate. The rhinophores and gill edges are orange. It may reach a total length of 50 mm.
This species is very similar in appearance to Hypselodoris carnea.

Ecology

This species feeds on an undescribed pale blue sponge. Its egg ribbon is a creamy collar of several whorls.

References

Chromodorididae
Gastropods described in 1927